World Misanthropy is a live DVD set by the Norwegian symphonic black metal band Dimmu Borgir. It was released on 28 May 2002 as a two disc set, with early pressings featuring the bonus CD, a VHS and the bonus disc separately as a limited edition clear 12" vinyl with white and green streaked spots with only 2000 copies pressed. The first disc was filmed during the tour to support the band's fifth studio album Puritanical Euphoric Misanthropia, while the second disc is a compilation of videos from previous tours and other media.

Track listing

Personnel
Shagrath – lead vocals
Silenoz – rhythm guitar
Galder – lead guitar
Nicholas Barker – drums
ICS Vortex – bass, clean vocals
Mustis – synthesizers, piano

Guest
Andy LaRocque – guitar solo on "Devil's Path" (Re-recorded version)

References

Dimmu Borgir albums
2002 video albums
2002 live albums
Live video albums
Nuclear Blast live albums
Nuclear Blast video albums